The 1911 Australian referendum was held on 26 April 1911. It contained two referendum questions.
__NoTOC__

Results in detail

Trade and Commerce
This section is an excerpt from 1911 Australian referendum (Trade and Commerce) § Results

Monopolies
This section is an excerpt from 1911 Australian referendum (Monopolies) § Results

See also
Referendums in Australia
Politics of Australia
History of Australia

References

Further reading
  
 .
 Australian Electoral Commission (2007) Referendum Dates and Results 1906 – Present AEC, Canberra.

1911 referendums
1911
Plebiscite
April 1911 events